Shrawardine railway station was a station in Shrawardine, Shropshire, England. The station was opened in 1866 and closed in 1933.

References

Further reading

Disused railway stations in Shropshire
Railway stations in Great Britain opened in 1866
Railway stations in Great Britain closed in 1933
Railway stations in Great Britain closed in 1866
Railway stations in Great Britain opened in 1868
Railway stations in Great Britain closed in 1880
Railway stations in Great Britain opened in 1911